Serous glands secrete serous fluid. They contain serous acini, a grouping of serous cells that secrete serous fluid, isotonic with blood plasma, that contains enzymes such as alpha-amylase.

Serous glands are most common in the parotid gland and lacrimal gland but are also present in the submandibular gland and, to a far lesser extent, the sublingual gland.

References

External links
  - "Tongue: Mucous and Serous Glands"
  - "Lingual Glands"
  - "Epithelial Tissue, Surface Specializations, and Glands multicellular; pure serous gland"
 Overview at siumed.edu

Glands